Hafnium tetrafluoride is the inorganic compound with the formula HfF4. It is a white solid.  It adopts the same structure as zirconium tetrafluoride, with 8-coordinate Hf(IV) centers.

References

Further reading
Benjamin, S. L., Levason, W., Pugh, D., Reid, G., Zhang, W., "Preparation and structures of coordination complexes of the very hard Lewis acids ZrF4 and HfF4", Dalton Transactions 2012, 41, 12548. 

Hafnium compounds
Fluorides
Metal halides